The Myanmar Language Commission (formerly Burmese Language Commission; abbreviated MLC) is the pre-eminent government body on matters pertaining to the Burmese language. It is responsible for several projects including the Myanmar–English Dictionary (1993) and MLC Transcription System for Romanization of Burmese.

Establishment

MLC's predecessor, the Literary and Translation Commission, was set up by the Union Revolutionary Council in August 1963, tasked with publishing an official standard Burmese dictionary, Burmese speller, manual on Burmese composition, compilation of Burmese lexicon, terminology, and translation, compilation and publication of textbooks, reference books, and periodicals for educational use.

The commission was re-established as the Burmese Language Commission (BLC) on 15 September 1971.

Members of the Myanmar Language Commission
Ba Nyunt, Retired Professor of History (deceased)
Chan Tha, "Letwe Minnyo", "Letyar Sanhta", Retired Chairman, Bureau of Special Investigation (deceased) 
Hla Pe, "Dagon U Hla Pe" (deceased)
San Htun, "San Htun, Man Tekkatho" (deceased)
San Ngwe, "Dagon U San Ngwe" (deceased)
Thaw Zin, "Thaw Zin" (deceased)
Aung Thaw, Retired Director General, Department of Archaeology
Hla Shwe, Retired Rector, University of Mandalay
Htin Gyi, "Tekkatho Htin Gyi" Retired Director, (deceased) Sarpay Beikhman
Htin Fatt, "Maung Htin" Retired Editor and Consultant, Burma Translation Society
Daw Kyan, "Ma Kyan", Retired Senior Research Officer, Historical Commission 
Myint Than, "Kahtika Daw Myint Than", Retired Lecturer in Burma 
Daw Ohn Khin, Retired Lecturer in Burma
Soe Maung, "Thagara Nga Soe", Retired Chief Editor, Burma Ah-lin Daily
Than Swe, "Mya Myinzu", Retired Professor of Burma
Win Pe, "Mya Zin", "Win Pe", Retired Director General, Department of National Archives 
Yin Yin, "Saw Mon Nyin" (deceased)

References

External links
Official website

Cultural organisations based in Myanmar
Burmese language
Language regulators